The UK Youth Climate Coalition (UKYCC) is a non-profit youth organisation in the United Kingdom. The organisation is run entirely by unpaid volunteers, who are all aged 18 to 29.

Formed in 2008, the mission of the organisation is to mobilise and empower young people to take positive action for global climate justice. To achieve its aims and objectives, the UKYCC organises a series of projects, campaigns and events each year, including sending youth delegations to the United Nations Climate Negotiations.

The organisation is supported by a coalition of non-governmental organisations.

Organisation

Formation 
In June 2008, the United Kingdom ambassadors to the World Wide Fund for Nature's Voyage for the Future programme, Emma Biermann and Casper ter Kuile, returned from the Arctic to found the UK Youth Climate Coalition (UKYCC) based on similar organisations such as the Australian Youth Climate Coalition and the Energy Action Coalition in the United States.

By bringing together several youth organisations and a coalition of non-governmental organisations, the co-founders intended to unite the work of their partners. Following this, the co-founders formed a coordinating team who worked on several projects, campaigns and events over the duration of the next year.

Mission and Vision 
The mission of the organisation is to mobilise and empower young people to take positive action for global climate justice. UKYCC's vision is a just, sustainable, world in which current and future generations enjoy and protect a healthy environment.

Governance and structure 
The UK Youth Climate Coalition (UKYCC) is run by a team of young volunteers between the ages of 18 and 29. The organisation itself is a registered private company limited by guarantee, with no share capital, which means it is run for non-profit purposes.

The organisation is split into several working groups to organise activities:

 Systems Change -  This group was developed out of the "Gas" working group, which focused on campaigning against the use and development of natural gas resources in the UK.
 COP - This group works internationally on climate justice issues. They spend the year training and engaging with a team of delegates at the yearly UNFCCC COP and Intersessionals.
 Community - This group aims to tackle climate change at a local level. They focus on capacity-building activities for communities, as well as local activism. 
 Youth Strike - This group works to help support the UK Youth Strike 4 Climate movement.
 LCOY - The group in charge of organising the UK's first Local Conference of Youth. These are conferences organised by YOUNGO (the youth wing of the UNFCCC) to empower youth climate activism.

These working groups are further supported by a Communications working group and an Operations working group which deal with key day-to-day aspects of the organisation. There are additionally a board of trustees who support organisers. The UKYCC is further supported by a coalition and works with several non-governmental organisations.

Internationally, the coalition affiliates with the Youth Climate Movement, with sister organisations in America, Australia, Canada, China and India. The UKYCC has also previously formed a partnership with the African Youth Initiative on Climate Change - Kenyan Chapter, with whom they share resources, experience and training.

Funding 
The UKYCC advertises that its core funding comes mainly from donations from its supporters. Projects undertaken by the volunteers have previously been funded by foundation grant applications, such as the Youth Funding Network, and in-kind support. For example, Seventeen Events provided pro-bono support to the volunteers to ensure their Powershift event was sustainable.

Activities

2008 
In 2008, the UK Youth Climate Coalition undertook several activities. Some of their projects included:
 In December, the UKYCC participated in the National Climate March organised by the Campaign against Climate Change, with a campaign called "Our time is now" to raise awareness of climate change amongst young people. 
 The same year, the volunteers organised a youth delegation to the 2008 United Nations Climate Change Conference in partnership with the Otesha Project. At the event, the delegation coordinated the 'Call Gordon' project, a viral telephone campaign asking then Prime Minister Gordon Brown to pursue a tougher agreement on climate change at the talks. 
 The UKYCC also began supporting the Green Finger Project, an online viral campaign that aims to show how climate change affects everyone. The project was initially the idea of Step it Up 2007, founded by Bill McKibben who went on to establish 350.org.

2009 
The UKYCC worked with the International Youth Movement, in particular, the European Youth Climate Movement to contribute to the "How old will you be in 2050?" campaign, launched at the United Nations Climate negotiations taking place in Bonn, Germany.

From 9–12 October 2009, the organisation organised an event called Power Shift, which was held at the Institute of Education in London. Modelled on a similar event to one organised by the Australian Youth Climate Coalition and carrying the same name as the Energy Action Coalition event in the US, the event was designed to provide training to young people on how to take action on climate change and also provide them with support to undertake their initiatives within their local communities

Three days before the 2009 United Nations Climate Change Conference in Copenhagen, Denmark, Kirsty Schneeberger, one of the 2009 Coordinators for the UKYCC, chaired a question-and-answer debate between a panel of government ministers and 80 young people. The panel included former Prime Minister Gordon Brown, Former Secretary of State for Energy and Climate Change Ed Miliband and Former Minister of State, Foreign & Commonwealth Office Baroness Glenys Kinnock.

A day later, members of the UK Youth Climate Coalition participated in the Wave, organised by coalition partner Stop Climate Chaos. It is estimated that between 40,000 and 50,000 individuals attended the march in London, in addition to over 7,000 participants in Glasgow.

Similarly to previous years, the organisation sent a second youth delegation to the 2009 United Nations Climate Change Conference. In preparation for the talks in Copenhagen, the Youth Delegation met negotiators from the Department of Energy and Climate Change. Darran Martin, one of the youth delegates, was reported to have cycled from the United Kingdom to Copenhagen, Denmark. Before and whilst in Copenhagen, the youth delegation recorded a series of documentaries, to providing inspiring stories directly to young people within the UK.

Midway through the Climate negotiations in December, the UKYCC also organised a Day of Action as the UK Delivery partner for the Global Campaign for Climate Action, also recognised as "TckTckTck". Alongside 1,600 actions taking place around the world, the UKYCC organised a flash dance outside the Houses of Parliament and projected an image onto the House of Commons, with the slogan, "the World wants a real deal". The day of action was designed to call on world leaders to create and agree on a fair, ambitious and legally binding deal as the outcome of the Climate negotiations that month.

2010 
On January 12, 2010, over 150 young people came together to explore ways in which young people can join the fight against climate change, in an event organised by the UK Youth Parliament. The event was supported by the UK Youth Climate Coalition and coalition partners Oxfam, Plan UK and UNICEF.

A month later, the Department for Energy and Climate Change launched a Youth Advisory Panel, including representatives from the UKYCC. It is reported that this followed a proposal suggested by the UK Youth Climate Coalition and their coalition partners People & Planet and Plan UK.

In April, the UKYCC launched a viral video campaign called "Shake your money maker" to raise awareness of ethical banking amongst its supporters. The campaign ran with the slogan, "It might not come with a free popcorn machine, but an ethical bank account will sow the seeds for a cleaner, brighter future." The organisation estimated that if each of their 2,000 supporters had £500 in their account and they were all to switch to an ethical bank, this would total £1 million.

Before the May General Elections, the UKYCC supported the British Youth Council Manifesto and the Vote Global campaign which intended to raise awareness of key issues during the election campaign.

Following the general election and to coincide with the formal opening of Parliament and the Queen's Speech on Tuesday 25 May, the UKYCC also launched a project called "Adopt an MP". The scheme intended to see 650 Members of Parliament in the UK "adopted" by a young person in their constituency, who would communicate the activities of their MP back to their communities.

2011 
At the start of 2011, the UK Youth Climate Coalition began providing training and resources to young people across Europe to enable them to organise Power Shift conferences. Alongside this event, the organisation coordinated a campaign, called "Push Europe" to encourage the European Union to commit to higher emission reduction targets.

A delegation of 13 young people also attended the climate negotiations in Durban, South Africa.

2012 
In 2012, the UK Youth Coalition launched the "Youth for Green Jobs" campaign, which aimed to highlight the opportunity to solve youth unemployment, improve the economy, and deliver reduced emissions.

COP18 took place in Qatar, with a delegation from the UK Youth Climate Coalition travelling to the talks.

2013 
In response to Education Secretary Michael Gove's proposal to remove climate change from the Geography national curriculum for under 14s, the UK Youth Climate Coalition set up a petition calling for a policy change. As a result of the 70,000 signatures, this received the policy was dropped.

The UK Youth Climate Coalition delegation to COP19 in Warsaw walked out a day early due to frustration at the lack of progress.

2014 
Two delegates from the UK Youth Climate Coalition attended COP20 in Lima, Peru. Other members attended "Lima in Brussels" a European youth conference tracking the negotiations from Europe.

2015 
Delegates were sent to COP21 in Paris, with the UK Youth Climate Coalition engaging in several actions. This included running workshops at the Conference of Youth, in human chain protests and in D12 (day of "red lines") actions.

2016 
The abolition of the Department of Energy and Climate Change by Theresa May in 2016 led to several actions from the Coalition. This included direct actions around Westminster, as well as an email and letter campaign.

COP22 was held in Marrakech, with another UK Youth Climate Coalition delegation attending.

2017 
The UK Youth Climate Coalition organised a Roundtable of youth organisations at the Department for Business, Energy and Industrial Strategy. Additionally engaging in actions with the Coal Action Network in front of BEIS, highlighting coal air pollution and public opposition.

A delegation attended COP23 in Bonn, Germany. The UK Youth Climate Coalition held a Gas side event, as well as bringing a resident from Preston New Road to the COP. Actions also focused on oceans and Barclay's sponsorship of the UK pavilion.

2018 
In 2018, the Coalition worked with Friends of the Earth on the "climate serious" campaign. This highlighted the inaction on climate change of HSBC, Danone and Npower.

The year also saw the launch of the Gas Campaign, which focused on opposing hydraulic fracking in the UK. This included both public education campaigns, as well as working at the Preston New Road site for the "Block around the Clock" and "Global Gasdown Frackdown" actions. Further pressure was placed on Claire Perry the Minister for Energy & Clean Growth with the "Do you Even Care Claire?" campaign, focused on opposing her support for fracking in the UK.

COP24 in Poland included work with YOUNGO (the youth constituency at the UNFCCC), working on climate justice campaigns, and highlighting gender discussions and vested interests within COP.

See also

References

External links 
UK Youth Climate Coalition

Climate change organisations based in the United Kingdom
Youth empowerment organizations
Youth-led organizations
Youth organisations based in the United Kingdom
2008 establishments in the United Kingdom
Organizations established in 2008